Dejan Marijanovič (born 2 January 1987) is a Slovenian footballer, who is currently playing for Italian Promozione side UFM Monfalcone.

Career
In July 2017, Marijanovič Clodiense in the Italian Serie D. In the following year, he moved to APC Chions, before joining Brian Lignano Calcio in the summer 2019.

References

External links
Dejan Marijanovič at TuttoCampo

Kicker.de profile
PrvaLiga profile 

1987 births
Living people
Slovenian footballers
Slovenian expatriate footballers
Association football midfielders
Association football forwards
ND Gorica players
NK Brda players
NK Primorje players
FC Koper players
A.C. Belluno 1905 players
A.C.D. Trissino-Valdagno players
Virtus Verona players
Clodiense S.S.D. players
A.S. Pro Gorizia players
Slovenian PrvaLiga players
Slovenian Second League players
Serie D players
Slovenian expatriate sportspeople in Italy
Expatriate footballers in Italy